Love and Destiny is a 2019 Chinese television series starring Chang Chen and Ni Ni. The series premiered on iQiyi on July 15, 2019. It later went on national broadcast and aired on Hubei Television and Shenzhen Satellite TV on January 26, 2020.

Love and Destiny is part of the Three Lives, Three Worlds series by Tang Qi Gong Zi (唐七公子), and related to Eternal Love and Eternal Love of Dream.

Synopsis 
This is a love story between God of War Jiu Chen, and a young fairy maiden named Ling Xi. Ling Xi accidentally awakens Jiu Chen who had been sleeping for fifty thousand years after he sealed the demon lord away.

Cast

Main

Heaven tribe

Peach Blossoms Forest

Shan Ling Tribe

Demon tribe

Mortal realm

Production
The series is produced by the team behind the 2017 drama Eternal Love, who stated that Love and Destiny is set in the same fictional world as Eternal Love and would be seen as a spin-off.

The series was filmed in Hengdian World Studios and Gansu from July to December 2018. 
Chang Chen and Ni Ni were announced as the leading actors on April 9, 2019 and a trailer was released the same day. The series marks Chang Chen's small screen debut. The rest of the supporting cast were unveiled on May 9, 2019.

Reception
The series received positive reviews for its plot and acting, rising from an initial douban score of 5.4 to 8.3. It received praise for spreading the beauty of Chinese culture and promoting positive values.

Soundtrack

Awards and nominations

References 

Chinese romantic fantasy television series
Xianxia television series
Television series by Croton Media
2019 web series debuts
2019 Chinese television series debuts
2019 Chinese television series endings
IQIYI original programming